The Heartland Flyer is a daily passenger train that follows a  route between Oklahoma City, Oklahoma, and Fort Worth, Texas. It is operated by Amtrak and jointly funded by the states of Oklahoma and Texas. The train's daily round-trip begins in Oklahoma City in the morning and reaches Fort Worth in the early afternoon. It leaves Fort Worth during the afternoon rush for an evening return to Oklahoma City. As of November 2014, the train is scheduled at 3 hours 58 minutes in each direction. Future plans call for the train's northern terminus to be extended from Oklahoma City to Newton, Kansas, with additional frequency along the original route.

The Heartland Flyer carried over 77,000 passengers in fiscal year 2016, a 4.2% decrease from FY2015. The train had a ticket revenue of $1,828,486, an increase of 1.8% from FY2015. Total revenue for the train, including state-level subsidies to Amtrak, was approximately $7.1 million.

History

At Amtrak's formation in 1971, the corridor was served by the railroad's Chicago–Houston Lone Star, itself the successor of the Santa Fe's Texas Chief. However, the Lone Star was discontinued in 1979, severing the state of Oklahoma from the national rail network. The Heartland Flyer was inaugurated on June 14, 1999, ending a 20-year absence of passenger rail in Oklahoma and North Texas. Senator Don Nickles sponsored a "Name the Train" contest, encouraging Oklahoma schoolchildren to pick a name for the new route. The winning name was submitted by Katie Moore, who christened the new train on its first run.

First-year ticket sales totaled 71,400 passengers, more than triple Amtrak's projection of 20,000 riders. The Heartland Flyer carried 68,000 passengers during FY 2007.  In September 2007 it had carried 500,000 passengers since its inception, and in November 2013, it carried its millionth passenger.

The temporary federal funding for the service was used up by 2005.  However, regional passenger rail advocates came out in force on April 11, 2005, for a state capitol rally sponsored by PassengerRailOk.org.  Keynote speaker, Oklahoma City Mayor Mick Cornett addressed the crowd along with the mayors of Perry, Guthrie, and Purcell, Oklahoma, encouraging the state fund the service and to expand the train into Kansas. State lawmakers kept the Heartland Flyer in operation by passing House Bill 1078 that provided an annual $2 million subsidy to continue the service.

In April 2016, Amtrak began Thruway bus service between the Heartland Flyer in Oklahoma City and the Southwest Chief in Newton, Kansas, with one stop in Wichita. The schedule runs mostly overnight since the Southwest Chief arrives in Newton in the early morning. Initial service was operated under contract by Village Tours of Wichita.

On October 15, 2021, the northbound Heartland Flyer struck a car hauler north of Thackerville, Oklahoma. The train partially derailed and four passengers were injured.

Expansion proposals

Extension to Kansas
Since its inception, numerous proposal have been made to extend the Heartland Flyer northward from Oklahoma City to Kansas along the original route of the Lone Star, discontinued in 1979. The extended line would serve Wichita Union Station before connecting with the Southwest Chief in Newton, Kansas. Some proposals would further extend the Heartland Flyer from Newton to  along the route of the Southwest Chief.

A 2009 study conducted by Amtrak proposed four options for the extension. One would extend the current round trip to Newton as a night train. Two would further extend the night train to Kansas City. Three would instead add a new day train to Kansas City from Fort Worth. Four would add the day train but only between Kansas City and Oklahoma City. Through car service with the Southwest Chief was also stated as a possibility. By September 2010, only the first and third options were said to remain under consideration.

In late 2011, the Kansas Department of Transportation released the results of a study into new service south to Fort Worth, presenting the options of a night train from Texas to Newton, with start-up costs of $87.5 million and an annual subsidy of $4.4 million, or a day train to Kansas City, with start-up costs of $245.5 million and an annual subsidy of $10 million.

On June 9, 2017, Amtrak ran an inspection train between Oklahoma City and Kansas City in order to explore the Heartland Flyer extension to Newton. Local dignitaries, BNSF officials, and DOT representatives from Oklahoma and Kansas were aboard.

In June 2021, Amtrak included the extension to Newton in its 15-year expansion vision. The plan also includes two additional round trips between Oklahoma City and Fort Worth. In November 2021, President Biden signed the Infrastructure Investment and Jobs Act, which could fund the plan. The extension was endorsed by the Oklahoma City Council in April 2022, and by Dodge City in October 2022.

Other proposals
During the 1990s, service to San Antonio, Texas, via Austin in conjunction with a reroute of the Texas Eagle west from Fort Worth to El Paso, Texas via Sierra Blanca was considered. This would have created another connection with the Sunset Limited.

In 2020, Amtrak reported it was working to add a new stop in Thackerville, Oklahoma, with access to the WinStar World Casino operated by the Chickasaw Nation.

Equipment used

The Heartland Flyer uses equipment from Amtrak's national fleet, typically two General Electric Genesis locomotives and two or three Superliner railcars. One of the Superliner cars is a snack coach with seating on the upper level of the car, and a small Café area on the lower level.

Previously, the Heartland Flyer used a combination of Hi-Level and Superliner railcars before converting to all Superliners. For many years, the train was powered by only one locomotive, and a Non-Powered Control Unit (NPCU) on the end of the train opposite the locomotive made the train bi-directional. In 2009, the NPCU was replaced with a standard Genesis P42DC, giving the train locomotive power on both ends. The train returned to having an NPCU in 2015 before an accident in 2017 caused it to alternate between having power on both ends and having the NPCU. It has since switched back to having locomotive power on both ends.

From April 2010 to April 2011, Amtrak and the Oklahoma Department of Transportation carried out a research project to run the train on a biodiesel blend known as B20 (20% pure biofuel and 80% diesel). P32-8 locomotive No. 500 carried an Amtrak decal indicating the use of this fuel. The test made national news when Time magazine listed it as one of "The 50 Best Inventions of 2010".

From its inception in 1999, the train has added additional cars to accommodate fans heading to Dallas, Texas to see the Red River Rivalry. The first train had one additional coach while subsequent trains have had as many as three additional cars. A "Sightseer" lounge is also added. The train was dubbed the "Big Game Train" and it runs every year with the exception of 2020, when it was cancelled due to the COVID-19 pandemic.

References

Notes

External links

Heartland Flyer Coalition

Amtrak routes
Railway services introduced in 1999
Passenger rail transportation in Texas
Passenger rail transportation in Oklahoma
Transportation in Fort Worth, Texas